Bob Fincher (born 1949 or 1950) is an American politician. He is a member of the Alabama House of Representatives from the 37th District, serving since 2014. He is a member of the Republican Party.

References

Living people
Republican Party members of the Alabama House of Representatives
2000 United States presidential electors
21st-century American politicians
Year of birth uncertain
People from Randolph County, Alabama
Year of birth missing (living people)